The Secret Zoo is a series of children's novels by American author Bryan Chick.

Background 
When he was nine years old, Bryan Chick went to the zoo in Detroit and wondered what would happen if the exhibits had secret doors that allowed children to go inside and the animals to come outside, and thus, The Secret Zoo was created. Chick began work on the first novel in the series in 2007 and it was published in June 2010. A box set of the series was released in August 2014.

Premise 
Set in the fictional town of Clarksville, United States, the Clarksville Zoo is not all it seems. Four kids: Noah Nowicki, his sister Megan, and their friends Richie and Ella live across the street from the zoo. One night they notice strange things going on at the zoo from their treehouse and decide to explore it. Here they find that there is a magical secret society that they become a part of where humans and animals can live together equally.

Chronology

Reception 
The series has received positive reviews. A reviewer from TheReadingTub praised book 1 of the series, calling it "a nice choice for reading aloud with a younger crowd". Publishers Weekly called it "an action-packed and breathless story about teamwork. (The) story should appeal both to animal-lovers and a broader audience". Kirkus, in a review of Secrets and Shadows, said that "while the tension between the preteen protagonists and the teens is both tangible and interesting, this installment feels more like novel-length worldbuilding than a story in itself."

References 

American fantasy novel series
Children's novels about animals
Adventure novel series
Children's fantasy novels